David Serrano de la Peña (born 1975) is a Spanish filmmaker as well as writer and adapter of musical stage plays.

Biography 
David Serrano de la Peña was born in Madrid in 1975. He penned the screenplay of the box-office hit The Other Side of the Bed, a 2002 musical comedy film directed by Emilio Martínez Lázaro, also taking over writing duties of its 2005 sequel, The 2 Sides of the Bed. His feature film directorial debut was the 2003 comedy Football Days, earning a nomination to the Goya Award for Best New Director. He has since directed  (2007),  (2010),  (2016), and Voy a pasármelo bien (2022).

References 

1975 births
Spanish film directors
Spanish television directors
21st-century Spanish screenwriters
Musical theatre librettists
21st-century Spanish dramatists and playwrights
Living people
Spanish male screenwriters